Springside Park is a recreational city park on the north side of Pittsfield, Massachusetts.   At  it is the city's largest park.  Much of the park is wooded, providing for passive recreational opportunities such as hiking.  The southwestern section of the park, nearest to North Street, is developed, with ballfields, a bath house, pond, and Springside House, an Italianate mansion whose early construction dates to c. 1856.  Some of the parklands are also used for the Hebert Arboretum.  Through the 1960s the City of Pittsfield operated a ski rope tow and provided ski lessons at the park.  The park was listed on the National Register of Historic Places in 2008.

History

In the early 19th century, the area that is now Springside Park was farmland, much of which belonged to the Strong family.  In 1808, Asahel Strong sold water rights to springs on land that may now be in the park to the Pittsfield Water Works Company.  Sometime in the late 1840s or early 1850s, Abraham Burbank established a gentleman's farm on land purchased from a Strong descendent.  A portion of Burbank's land, including the house, was sold in the 1850s to a private boarding school operated by Charles Abbott.  Around this time, Burbank apparently began construction on Elmhurst, the building that is now called Springside House.  It was further enlarged in the 1870s by John Davol, a businessman who purchased Burbank's farm in 1872.  It was acquired by Clarence Stephens in 1904, and became part of Springside Park in 1938.

The formation of the park was spearheaded by former mayor Kelton Miller, who began purchasing land near the Burbank/Davol/Stephens estate in 1908. He and his wife Eva donated  land south and east of the estate to the city in 1910, and continued to make land donations afterward. Development of the park's infrastructure began in the years following this acquisition. The park was reduced in size when the nearby school was built, but the city compensated by making additional land acquisitions, eventually bringing the park to its present size.

See also

National Register of Historic Places listings in Berkshire County, Massachusetts

References

External links
Hebert Arboretum

Historic districts on the National Register of Historic Places in Massachusetts
National Register of Historic Places in Berkshire County, Massachusetts
Parks in Berkshire County, Massachusetts
Parks on the National Register of Historic Places in Massachusetts
Pittsfield, Massachusetts